Oceanic trenches are prominent, long, narrow topographic depressions of the ocean floor.

Oceanic trenches are a feature of the Earth's distinctive plate tectonics. They mark the locations of convergent plate boundaries, along which lithospheric plates move towards each other at rates that vary from a few millimeters to over ten centimeters per year. A trench marks the position at which the flexed, subducting slab begins to descend beneath another lithospheric slab.

Much of the fluid trapped in sediments of the subducting slab returns to the surface at the oceanic trench, producing mud volcanoes and cold seeps. These support unique biomes based on chemotrophic microorganisms. There is concern that plastic debris is accumulating in trenches and threatening these communities.

Geographic distribution 

These are mostly located around the Pacific Ocean, but are also found in the eastern Indian Ocean, with a few shorter convergent margin segments in other parts of the Indian Ocean, in the Atlantic Ocean, and in the Mediterranean. They are found on the oceanward side of island arcs and Andean-type orogens. Globally, there are over 50 major ocean trenches covering an area of 1.9 million km2 or about 0.5% of the oceans.

Trenches are geomorphologically distinct from troughs. Troughs are elongated depressions of the sea floor with steep sides and flat bottoms, while trenches are characterized by a V-shaped profile. Trenches that are partially infilled are sometimes described as troughs, for example the Makran Trough. Some trenches are completely buried and lack bathymetric expression as in the Cascadia subduction zone, which is completely filled with sediments. Despite their appearance, in these instances the fundamental plate-tectonic structure is still an oceanic trench. 

Some troughs look similar to oceanic trenches but possess other tectonic structures. One example is the Lesser Antilles Trough, which is the forearc basin of the Lesser Antilles subduction zone. Also not a trench is the New Caledonia trough, which is an extensional sedimentary basin related to the Tonga-Kermadec subduction zone. Additionally, the Cayman Trough, which is a pull-apart basin within a transform fault zone, is not an oceanic trench.

Trenches, along with volcanic arcs and Wadati-Benioff zones (zones of earthquakes under a volcanic arc) are diagnostic of convergent plate boundaries and their deeper manifestations, subduction zones. At least one of the plates is oceanic lithosphere, which plunges under the other plate to be recycled in the Earth's mantle. 

Trenches are related to, but distinct from, continental collision zones, such as the Himalayas. Unlike in trenches, in continental collision zones continental crust enters a subduction zone. When buoyant continental crust enters a trench, subduction comes to a halt and the area becomes a zone of continental collision. Features analogous to trenches are associated with collision zones. One such feature is the peripheral foreland basin, a sediment-filled foredeep. Examples of peripheral foreland basins include the floodplains of the Ganges River and the Tigris-Euphrates river system.

History of the term "trench" 
Trenches were not clearly defined until the late 1940s and 1950s. The bathymetry of the ocean was poorly known prior to the Challenger expedition of 1872–1876, which took 492 soundings of the deep ocean. At station #225, the expedition discovered Challenger Deep, now known to be the southern end of the Mariana Trench. The laying of transatlantic telegraph cables on the seafloor between the continents during the late 19th and early 20th centuries provided further motivation for improved bathymetry. The term trench, in its modern sense of a prominent elongated depression of the sea bottom, was first used by Johnstone in his 1923 textbook An Introduction to Oceanography.

During the 1920s and 1930s, Felix Andries Vening Meinesz measured gravity over trenches using a newly developed gravimeter that could measure gravity from aboard a submarine. He proposed the tectogene hypothesis to explain the belts of negative gravity anomalies that were found near island arcs. According to this hypothesis, the belts were zones of downwelling of light crustal rock arising from subcrustal convection currents. The tectogene hypothesis was further developed by Griggs in 1939, using an analogue model based on a pair of rotating drums. Harry Hammond Hess substantially revised the theory based on his geological analysis.

World War II in the Pacific led to great improvements of bathymetry, particularly in the western Pacific. In light of these new measurements, the linear nature of the deeps became clear. There was a rapid growth of deep sea research efforts, especially the widespread use of echosounders in the 1950s and 1960s. These efforts confirmed the morphological utility of the term "trench." Important trenches were identified, sampled, and mapped via sonar. 

The early phase of trench exploration reached its peak with the 1960 descent of the Bathyscaphe Trieste to the bottom of the Challenger Deep. Following Robert S. Dietz’ and Harry Hess’ promulgation of the seafloor spreading hypothesis in the early 1960s and the plate tectonic revolution in the late 1960s, the oceanic trench became an important concept in plate tectonic theory.

Morphology 

The bottom of the trench marks the boundary between the subducting and overriding plates, known as the basal plate boundary shear or the subduction décollement. The depth of the trench depends on the starting depth of the oceanic lithosphere as it begins its plunge into the trench, the angle at which the slab plunges, and the amount of sedimentation in the trench. Both starting depth and subduction angle are greater for older oceanic lithosphere, which is reflected in the deep trenches of the western Pacific.

Though narrow, oceanic trenches are remarkably long and continuous, forming the largest linear depressions on earth. An individual trench can be thousands of kilometers long. Most trenches are convex towards the subducting slab, which is attributed to the spherical geometry of the Earth.

The trench asymmetry reflects the different physical mechanisms that determine the inner and outer slope angle. The outer slope angle of the trench is determined by the bending radius of the subducting slab, as determined by its elastic thickness. Since oceanic lithosphere thickens with age, the outer slope angle is ultimately determined by the age of the subducting slab. The inner slope angle is determined by the angle of repose of the overriding plate edge. This reflects frequent earthquakes along the trench that prevent oversteepening of the inner slope.

As the subducting plate approaches the trench, it bends slightly upwards before beginning its plunge into the depths. As a result, the outer trench slope is bounded by an outer trench high. This is subtle, often only tens of meters high, and is typically located a few tens of kilometers from the trench axis. On the outer slope itself, where the plate begins to bend downwards into the trench, the upper part of the subducting slab is broken by bending faults that give the outer trench slope a horst and graben topography. The formation of these bending faults is suppressed where oceanic ridges or large seamounts are subducting into the trench, but the bending faults cut right across smaller seamounts. Where the subducting slab is only thinly veneered with sediments, the outer slope will often show seafloor spreading ridges oblique to the horst and graben ridges.

Sedimentation 
Trench morphology is strongly modified by the amount of sedimentation in the trench. This varies from practically no sedimentation, as in the Tonga-Kermadec trench, to almost completely filled with sediments, as with the southern Lesser Antilles trench or the eastern Alaskan trench. Sedimentation is largely controlled by whether the trench is near a continental sediment source. The range of sedimentation is well illustrated by the Chilean trench. The north Chile portion of the trench, which lies along the Atacama Desert with its very slow rate of weathering, is sediment-starved, with from 20 to a few hundred meters of sediments on the trench floor. The tectonic morphology of this trench segment is fully exposed on the ocean bottom. The central Chile segment of the trench is moderately sedimented, with sediments onlapping onto pelagic sediments or ocean basement of the subducting slab, but the trench morphology is still clearly discernible. The southern Chile segment of the trench is fully sedimented, to the point where the outer rise and slope are no longer discernible.

Sediments are sometimes transported along the axis of an oceanic trench. The central Chile trench experiences transport of sediments from source fans along an axial channel. Similar transport of sediments has been documented in the Aleutian trench.

In addition to sedimentation from rivers draining into a trench, sedimentation also takes place from landslides on the tectonically steepened inner slope, often driven by megathrust earthquakes. The Reloca Slide of the central Chile trench is an example of this process.

Erosive versus accretionary margins 
Convergent margins are classified as erosive or accretionary, and this has a strong influence on the morphology of the inner slope of the trench. Erosive margins, such as the northern Peru-Chile, Tonga-Kermadec, and Mariana trenches, correspond to sediment-starved trenches. The subducting slab erodes material from the lower part of the overriding slab, reducing its volume. The edge of the slab experiences subsidence and steepening, with normal faulting. The slope is underlain by relative strong igneous and metamorphic rock, which maintains a high angle of repose. Over half of all convergent margins are erosive margins.

Accretionary margins, such as the southern Peru-Chile, Cascadia, and Aleutians, are associated with moderately to heavily sedimented trenches. As the slab subducts, sediments are "bulldozed" onto the edge of the overriding plate, producing an accretionary wedge or accretionary prism. This builds the overriding plate outwards. Because the sediments lack strength, their angle of repose is gentler than the rock making up the inner slope of erosive margin trenches. The inner slope is underlain by imbricated thrust sheets of sediments. The inner slope topography is roughened by localized mass wasting. Cascadia has practically no bathymetric expression of the outer rise and trench, due to complete sediment filling, but the inner trench slope is complex, with many thrust ridges. These compete with canyon formation by rivers draining into the trench.  Inner trench slopes of erosive margins rarely show thrust ridges.

Accretionary prisms grow in two ways. The first is by frontal accretion, in which sediments are scraped off the downgoing plate and emplaced at the front of the accretionary prism. As the accretionary wedge grows, older sediments further from the trench become increasingly lithified, and faults and other structural features are steepened by rotation towards the trench. The other mechanism for accretionary prism growth is underplating (also known as basal accretion) of subducted sediments, together with some oceanic crust, along the shallow parts of the subduction decollement. The Franciscan Group of California is interpreted as an ancient accretionary prism in which underplating is recorded as tectonic mélanges and duplex structures.

Earthquakes 
Frequent megathrust earthquakes modify the inner slope of the trench by triggering massive landslides. These leave semicircular landslide scarps with slopes of up to 20 degrees on the headwalls and sidewalls.

Subduction of seamounts and aseismic ridges into the trench may increase aseismic creep and reduce the severity of earthquakes. Contrariwise, subduction of large amounts of sediments may allow ruptures along the subduction décollement to propagate for great distances to produce megathrust earthquakes.

Trench rollback 
Trenches seem positionally stable over time, but scientists believe that some trenches—particularly those associated with subduction zones where two oceanic plates converge—move backward into the subducting plate. This is called trench rollback or hinge retreat (also hinge rollback) and is one explanation for the existence of back-arc basins.
 
Forces perpendicular to the slab (the portion of the subducting plate within the mantle) are responsible for steepening of the slab and, ultimately, the movement of the hinge and trench at the surface. These forces arise from the negative buoyancy of the slab with respect to the mantle modified by the geometry of the slab itself. The extension in the overriding plate, in response to the subsequent subhorizontal mantle flow from the displacement of the slab, can result in formation of a back-arc basin.

Processes involved

Several forces are involved in the process of slab rollback. Two forces acting against each other at the interface of the two subducting plates exert forces against one another. The subducting plate exerts a bending force (FPB) that supplies pressure during subduction, while the overriding plate exerts a force against the subducting plate (FTS). The slab pull force (FSP) is caused by the negative buoyancy of the plate driving the plate to greater depths. The resisting force from the surrounding mantle opposes the slab pull forces. Interactions with the 660-km discontinuity cause a deflection due to the buoyancy at the phase transition (F660).  The unique interplay of these forces is what generates slab rollback. When the deep slab section obstructs the down-going motion of the shallow slab section, slab rollback occurs. The subducting slab undergoes backward sinking due to the negative buoyancy forces causing a retrogradation of the trench hinge along the surface. Upwelling of the mantle around the slab can create favorable conditions for the formation of a back-arc basin.

Seismic tomography provides evidence for slab rollback. Results demonstrate high temperature anomalies within the mantle suggesting subducted material is present in the mantle. Ophiolites are viewed as evidence for such mechanisms as high pressure and temperature rocks are rapidly brought to the surface through the processes of slab rollback, which provides space for the exhumation of ophiolites.

Slab rollback is not always a continuous process suggesting an episodic nature. The episodic nature of the rollback is explained by a change in the density of the subducting plate, such as the arrival of buoyant lithosphere (a continent, arc, ridge, or plateau), a change in the subduction dynamics, or a change in the plate kinematics. The age of the subducting plates does not have any effect on slab rollback. Nearby continental collisions have an effect on slab rollback. Continental collisions induce mantle flow and extrusion of mantle material, which causes stretching and arc-trench rollback. In the area of the Southeast Pacific, there have been several rollback events resulting in the formation of numerous back-arc basins.

Mantle interactions

Interactions with the mantle discontinuities play a significant role in slab rollback. Stagnation at the 660-km discontinuity causes retrograde slab motion due to the suction forces acting at the surface. Slab rollback induces mantle return flow, which causes extension from the shear stresses at the base of the overriding plate. As slab rollback velocities increase, circular mantle flow velocities also increase, accelerating extension rates. Extension rates are altered when the slab interacts with the discontinuities within the mantle at 410 km and 660 km depth. Slabs can either penetrate directly into the lower mantle, or can be retarded due to the phase transition at 660 km depth creating a difference in buoyancy. An increase in retrograde trench migration (slab rollback) (2–4 cm/yr) is a result of flattened slabs at the 660-km discontinuity where the slab does not penetrate into the lower mantle. This is the case for the Japan, Java and Izu–Bonin trenches. These flattened slabs are only temporarily arrested in the transition zone. The subsequent displacement into the lower mantle is caused by slab pull forces, or the destabilization of the slab from warming and broadening due to thermal diffusion. Slabs that penetrate directly into the lower mantle result in slower slab rollback rates (~1–3 cm/yr) such as the Mariana arc, Tonga arcs.

Hydrothermal activity and associated biomes 

As sediments are subducted at the bottom of trenches, much of their fluid content is expelled and moves back along the subduction décollement to emerge on the inner slope as mud volcanoes and cold seeps. Methane clathrates and gas hydrates also accumulate in the inner slope, and there is concern that their breakdown could contribute to global warming.

The fluids released at mud volcanoes and cold seeps are rich in methane and hydrogen sulfide, providing chemical energy for chemotrophic microorganisms that form the base of a unique trench biome. Cold seep communities have been identified in the inner trench slopes of the western Pacific (especially Japan), South America, Barbados, the Mediterranean, Makran, and the Sunda trench. The genome of the extremophile Deinococcus from Challenger Deep has sequenced for its ecological insights and potential industrial uses.

Because trenches are the lowest points in the ocean floor, there is concern that plastic debris may accumulate in trenches and endanger the fragile trench biomes.

Deepest oceanic trenches 
Older measurements may be off by hundreds of meters.

Notable oceanic trenches 

(*) The five deepest trenches in the world

Ancient oceanic trenches

See also

 List of landforms
 List of submarine topographical features
 Mid-ocean ridge
 Physical oceanography
 Ring of Fire

References

Bibliography
 
 
 
 
 
 
 
 
 
 
 
 
 
 
 
 
 
 
 
 

 
 
 
 
 
 
 
 
 
 
 
 
 
 
 

 
 
 
 
 
 
 
 
 
 
  458p.
 </ref>

External links

 
Depressions (geology)
Coastal and oceanic landforms
Submarine topography
Oceanographical terminology
Plate tectonics
Subduction